Franziska Schenk (born 13 March 1974) is a former German speed skater. She was a specialist in the sprint distances (500 and 1000 m). At the 1994 Winter Olympics in Lillehammer, she won a bronze on the 500 m in Vikingskipet at Hamar. After that she won the bronze medal in the Sprint World Championships in 1995 and 1996, she won overall in 1997, also in Vikingskipet. At the World Allround she won three bronze medals, two in 1997 and one in 1998. In addition she won 11 World Cup victories during her career.

External links
 
 Photos of Franziska Schenk

1974 births
German female speed skaters
Speed skaters at the 1994 Winter Olympics
Speed skaters at the 1998 Winter Olympics
Olympic speed skaters of Germany
Medalists at the 1994 Winter Olympics
Olympic medalists in speed skating
Olympic bronze medalists for Germany
Sportspeople from Erfurt
Living people
World Sprint Speed Skating Championships medalists